The Vedița is a left tributary of the river Vedea in Romania. It discharges into the Vedea near Sârbii-Măgura. The following towns and villages are situated along the river Vedița, from source to mouth: Gorani, Braniștea, Romana, Uda, Bărănești, Râjlețu-Govora, Vedea, Chițani, Bărăștii de Vede, Colonești and Sârbii-Măgura.

References

Rivers of Romania
Rivers of Olt County
Rivers of Argeș County